Lego Creator is a sandbox game for Microsoft Windows, which involves building with virtual Lego elements. The game has no missions, objectives, challenges, or money constraints. The game was released on 11 November 1998.

Gameplay

Lego Creator was initially conceived of as an 'Evergreen' replication of the physical toy. Starting with the 'Town' range, the game would expand at each release with the addition of further product themes. Functionality would also be enhanced with each 'content pack'.

Ultimately, individual ranges remained independent, and emphasis shifted to a play experience, with reduced emphasis on freeform construction. Originally, it had been hoped that sheer scale of unlimited bricks might offset the loss of tactile merit, but such hope was compromised by the computers of the day. Plans included being able to build content, which could be seamlessly dropped into separate Lego video games. This was dropped as the complexity of doing so was further explored.
 
By the time the Harry Potter theme was introduced to the game, the series had shifted far from the original premise of freeform LEGO construction. Instead, the product moved toward a more limited build environment, but with superior gameplay.

In addition to the regular bricks in an assortment of colors, there are specified "Action Bricks", which move or make noise. Examples include the hinge, propeller, and siren. There is also a "Destructa Brick", a 1x2 tile with an image of dynamite superimposed on it. This can be used to destroy models in Play Mode, although the player's creations will automatically rebuild when returning to Build Mode. Minifigures can also be used, and can stand, sit, or walk, and can be set to drive vehicles set to a path or road. In play mode, minifigures and vehicles can travel around the environment, special bricks can be interacted with, the sky can be set from day to night, and the player can control or see from the perspective of any minifigures set to move around, vehicles, and security cameras. Minifigures make gibberish sounds during play mode, and the game's instruction manual details how to replace the audio files for these sounds with custom files.

Awards
Lego Creator received 4 awards: Computer Game Developers Spotlight Award, Best New Children's Game; CODIE Software Publishers Association Excellence in Software Awards, Best New Home Creativity Software (US); "Top 100 Family Tested", Family PC Magazine; and PIN Quality Mark Gold Award, Parents Information. It was also nominated at the 2nd annual interactive achievement awards for computer children's game of the year.

Sequels

Lego Creator was followed by three sequels.

Lego Creator: Knights' Kingdom

Lego Creator: Knights' Kingdom is a medieval-themed construction and management simulation video game developed by Superscape and published by Lego Software in 2000. It is a stand-alone sequel to Lego Creator and is based on the first incarnation of the Lego Knights' Kingdom theme.

Lego Creator: Harry Potter
Lego Creator: Harry Potter is a construction and management simulation video game based on the 2001 Harry Potter film Harry Potter and the Philosopher's Stone and the Lego Harry Potter brand of building block sets. It was developed by Superscape and published by Lego Software in late 2001. It is the first Lego game based on a licensed property. In the game, the player can build Harry Potter-themed worlds and complete challenges.

Lego Creator: Harry Potter is related to the film version of Harry Potter and the Philosopher's Stone and allows the player to play as various different characters and go into four general areas, plus 5 extra areas. The area of Inside Hogwarts school has four place-able extra rooms to reach other areas, including Professor Snape's Potions Class and the Forbidden Corridor. The game includes many features that give the player a lot of creative ability. Features include taking control of minifigures and animals, driving the Hogwarts Express, changing the weather from rain to snow to night to day, casting spells and flying on broomsticks, and creating your own minifigures and models with classical and Harry Potter style Lego faces, bodies, cloaks and even wands; while the workshop contains castle pieces, to extras, to standard pieces.

Creator: Harry Potter and the Chamber of Secrets
Creator: Harry Potter and the Chamber of Secrets is the sequel to Lego Creator: Harry Potter, which focuses on the second movie, Harry Potter and the Chamber of Secrets. This is the only Lego Creator installment not to be developed by Superscape, instead being developed by Qube Software and published by Electronic Arts and Lego Interactive in 2002.

While the sequel contains many of the same features as the debut game, more additional features were added to enhance the player's creative ability, including more models, more worlds, and more minifigures. Certain characters or animals can reach certain areas of the game. Completing tasks will unlock different worlds and models the player can use in their own world. These tasks are tutorials, which show the user all the features of the program.

Reviews
Feibel.de
PlayDome
All Game Guide

References 

1998 video games
Construction and management simulation games
Creator (video game)
Single-player video games
Superscape games
Video games developed in the United Kingdom
Windows games
Windows-only games